The Mongolian Cyrillic alphabet (Mongolian: ,  or) is the writing system used for the standard dialect of the Mongolian language in the modern state of Mongolia. It has a largely phonemic orthography, meaning that there is a fair degree of consistency in the representation of individual sounds. Cyrillic has not been adopted as the writing system in the Inner Mongolia region of China, which continues to use the traditional Mongolian script.

History
Mongolian Cyrillic is the most recent of the many writing systems that have been used for Mongolian.  It uses the same characters as the Russian alphabet except for the two additional characters Өө  and Үү .

It was introduced in the 1940s in the Mongolian People's Republic under Soviet influence, after two months in 1941 where Latin was used as the official script, while Latinisation in the Soviet Union was in vogue. After the Mongolian democratic revolution in 1990, the traditional Mongolian script was briefly considered to replace Cyrillic, but the plan was canceled in the end. However, the Mongolian script has become a compulsory subject in primary and secondary schooling and is slowly gaining in popularity. The Mongolian script is a highly uncommon vertical script, and unlike other historically vertical-only scripts such as the Chinese script it cannot easily be adapted for horizontal use, which puts it at a disadvantage compared to Cyrillic for many modern purposes. Thus, the Cyrillic script continues to be used in everyday life.

In March 2020, the Mongolian government announced plans to use both Cyrillic and the traditional Mongolian script in official documents by 2025.

In China, Cyrillic alphabet also used by the Chinese to learn the modern Mongolian language, and by some Mongols in Inner Mongolia to demonstrate their ethnic identity.

Description

The Cyrillic alphabet used for Mongolian is as follows (with borrowed sounds in parentheses):

Үү and Өө are sometimes also written as the Ukrainian letters Її (or Vv) and Єє  respectively, when using Russian software or keyboards that do not support them.

Initial long vowels and non-initial full vowels are written with double vowel letters, while initial short vowels and non-initial epenthetic vowels are written with single vowel letters. Conversely, every vowel letter except у and ү can also represent schwa and zero in non-first syllables. Palatalisation is indicated by и (i), the soft sign ь (') or е (ye), ё (yo), я (ya) and ю (yu) after the palatalised consonant. These latter letters are pronounced without [j] in that position. Щ is never used in Mongolian and only used in Russian words containing the letter. It is pronounced identically to Ш, and is often omitted when teaching the Cyrillic alphabet. Sometimes, Russian loanwords with Щ will be spelled with Ш instead: борш, Хрушев. The difference between [e~i] might be dialectal, while the difference between ɵ~o is positional.

In words with "front" (+ATR) vowels (see Mongolian phonology for details), it always means , because only  occurs in such words.

The original plan as at 10 October 1945 was to use э only at the beginning of words and in long vowel combinations (as is done in other languages written using Russian-based Cyrillic), дз for modern з, дж for modern ж, ии for modern ий and йө for modern е (to represent the "yö" sound at the beginning of words), but the alphabet was changed to its final form on 13 November.

Keyboard layout

The standard Mongolian Cyrillic keyboard layout for personal computers is as follows:

See also

 Mongolian writing systems
Mongolian script
Galik alphabet
Todo alphabet
ʼPhags-pa script
Horizontal square script
Soyombo script
Mongolian Latin alphabet
SASM/GNC romanization § Mongolian
Mongolian transliteration of Chinese characters

Mongolian Braille
 Mongolian Sign Language
 Mongolian name

References 

Cyrillic alphabets
Mongolian writing systems

mn:Кирилл монгол бичгийн дүрэм